Pedro Segundo Araya Zavala (25 July 1925 – 22 December 1998) was a Chilean basketball player. He competed in the men's tournament at the 1952 Summer Olympics and the 1956 Summer Olympics.

References

External links

1925 births
1998 deaths
Chilean men's basketball players
1954 FIBA World Championship players
Olympic basketball players of Chile
Basketball players at the 1952 Summer Olympics
Basketball players at the 1956 Summer Olympics
Sportspeople from Santiago
1950 FIBA World Championship players